Barbara Mitchell (4 October 1929 – 9 December 1977, Kingston Upon Thames) was an English actress who became a familiar face on British television in the 1960s and 1970s, best known for her work in many classic sitcoms of the period.

Career 

Mitchell started out as a stage actress, and gained a foothold in television with a number of appearances in popular shows in the 1960s. In 1970, she got her first leading TV role, as Ruth, the daughter of the title character (Irene Handl) in the gentle comedy For the Love of Ada, which ran for four series and 27 episodes, followed by a spin-off film. At the same time, she was appearing periodically as Mrs. Abbott, the absurdly over-protective mother of would-be tough guy Frankie ("Mummy's little soldier"), in Please Sir! and its sequel The Fenn Street Gang. Mitchell's appearances as Mrs. Abbott were sporadic, and fleeting, but were hugely popular and are still remembered with affection.

She appeared as Isabel Chintz, a tough Australian pop agent, in Superstar, a 1973 episode of The Goodies. In Lizzie Dripping, a BBC children's programme which ran for two series in 1973 and 1975, Mitchell played Patty Arbuckle, the often harassed mother of Penelope (Tina Heath), while her longest-running role came in the Yorkshire Television production Beryl's Lot, 52 episodes over three series between 1973 and 1977, in which she played Vi Tonks, married to Trevor (Tony Caunter) and neighbour and friend to the titular Beryl (Carmel McSharry).

She is also fondly remembered in a series of late 1960s / early 1970s UK commercials for dish washing product Fairy Liquid, where she played blonde beehived Madge the employer of a beauty salon who for some reason encouraged customers to dip their fingers into a small bowl of the aforesaid substance to demonstrate how kind it was to hands.

Personal life and death 

She was married to actor Rex Graham, (1924 - 1991), (a former Ghurka).

She had two children, Melannie, (to whom Peggy Mount was Godmother), and Jeremy.

They lived in Crescent Road, Kingston-upon-Thames.

Mitchell died of breast cancer on 9 December 1977, aged 48.

Appearances 
Films
1960: Inn for Trouble - Hetty Prout
1963: Ladies Who Do - Rose
1971: Please Sir! - Mrs. Abbott
1972: For the Love of Ada - Ruth Pollitt
1976: The Twelve Tasks of Asterix - (English version, voice)
1977: What's Up Nurse! - Neighbour (final film role)

Television
1958-1964: The Larkins - Hetty Prout
1959: Emergency – Ward 10 - Mrs. Garland
1960: The Secret Garden - Nurse
1963: Z-Cars - Mrs. Evans
1963: Bud - Mrs. Chanyne
1965–1966: Dixon of Dock Green - Mrs. Rudd / Amy Ashton
1966: Play of the Week - Tessa Lucas
1969: Ours Is a Nice House - Stella Barrington
1969: Dombey and Son - Mrs. MacStinger
1970: Please Sir! - Mrs. Abbott
1970–1971: For the Love of Ada - Ruth Pollitt
1970–1971: The Doctors - Connie Higson
1971: Doctor at Large - Schoolmistress
1971–1973 The Fenn Street Gang - Mrs. Abbott
1973: The Gordon Peters Show - Mrs. M
1973: The Goodies - Isabel Chintz
1973–1975: Lizzie Dripping - Patty Arbuckle
1973–1977: Beryl's Lot - Vi Tonks
1974: Funny Ha-Ha - Kate Carter
1974: My Name is Harry Worth - Miss Sugget
1977: Yanks Go Home - Lady Gertrude

References

External links 
 Lizzie Dripping information page

1929 births
1977 deaths
English television actresses
English film actresses
Deaths from cancer in England
Deaths from breast cancer
20th-century English actresses
20th-century British businesspeople